Elizabeth Harrison Shapley was an American former First Lady of Guam.

Early life 
On February 11, 1884, Shapley was born as Elizabeth Harrison McCormick in New York City, New York.

Career 
In 1926, when Lloyd Stowell Shapley was appointed the military Governor of Guam, Shapley became the First Lady of Guam on April 7, 1926, until June 11, 1929.

Personal life 
On April 9, 1902, Shapley married Charles Frederick Herreshoff, who later became an automobile designer/manufacturer and an architect. Shapeley's full name became Elizabeth Harrison McCormick Herrshoff.

On August 1, 1912, Shapley divorced Charles Frederick Herreshoff.

On November 6, 1912, on Mare Island in Vallejo, California, Shapley married Lloyd Stowell Shapley, who later became a United States Navy Captain and Military Governor of Guam. Shapley had three children from her previous marriage, Alan, Elizabeth Sult, and Sylvia.

Shapley's son Alan Shapley (1903-1973) became a Lieutenant General of the United States Marine Corps. He was a survivor of USS Arizona (BB-39).

On April 25, 1918, Shapley's daughter Elizabeth Harrison Shapley became a sponsor of USS Kilty (DD-137).

On August 7, 1938, Shapley died in California.

References 

1884 births
1938 deaths
First Ladies and Gentlemen of Guam
People from New York City